Buellia erubescens, the common button lichen, is a species of lichen in the genus Buellia. It is found commonly on the bark and occasionally on the wood of Quercus, Pinus, Juniperus, or other species of trees with bark that has generally low pH. It is common between  elevation, and is common in submontane to subalpine forests.

Distribution
Buellia erubescens is widely distributed throughout the North America and Europe.

See also
 List of Buellia species''

References

erubescens
Lichen species
Taxa named by Ferdinand Christian Gustav Arnold
Lichens described in 1875
Lichens of North America
Lichens of Europe